The Highland splitfin (Hubbsina turneri) is a species of splitfin endemic to Mexico where it is found in the Lerma River basin.  This species grows to a length of  TL.  It is the only known member of its genus, although some authorities have Hubbina as a subgenus of Girardinichthys and add Girardinichthys ireneae to the subgenus, even treating this taxon as a synonym of G. ireneae. This species was described by Don Fernando de Buen y Lozano in 1940 with the type locality given as Cointzio, Michoacán. The name of the genus honours the American ichthyologist Carl Leavitt Hubbs (1894-1979) while the specific name honours Clarence Lester Turner (1890-1969), thus honouring two ichthyologists who worked on a review of the Goodeidae in 1939.

References

Goodeinae
Freshwater fish of Mexico
Endemic fish of Mexico
Critically endangered biota of Mexico
Critically endangered animals
Fish described in 1940
Monotypic freshwater fish genera
Ray-finned fish genera
Taxa named by Fernando de Buen y Lozano
Taxonomy articles created by Polbot
Lerma River